October 9 - Eastern Orthodox liturgical calendar - October 11

All fixed commemorations below celebrated on October 23 by Orthodox Churches on the Old Calendar.

For October 10th, Orthodox Churches on the Old Calendar commemorate the Saints listed on September 27.

Saints

 Saint Pinytus (Gr. Πινυτός), Bishop of Knossos in Crete (c. 180)
 Martyr Theotecnus of Antioch (3rd-4th century)
 Martyrs Eulampius and Eulampia and 200 martyrs with them, at Nicomedia (303-311)
 Saint Maharsapor (or Sapor; died 421), an early Persian martyr.
 Saint Bassian of Constantinople (c. 458)
 Venerables Theophilus the Confessor and Longinus the Stylite (716)

Pre-Schism Western saints

 Martyrs of the Theban Legion, along the Rhine (c. 287): 
 Saints Cassius and Florentius, at Bonn;
 Saints Gereon and companions, at Cologne;
 Saints Victor and companions, at Xanten (Germany)
 Saint Clarus of Nantes (Clair), Bishop of Nantes in France (3rd century)
 Saint Cerbonius, Bishop of Verona in Italy (c. 400)
 Saint Patrician, a bishop in Scotland who was driven out by heathen and spent the remainder of his life on the Isle of Man (5th century)
 Saint Cerbonius, Bishop of Populonia in Tuscany, during the Barbarian invasions (c. 580)
 Saint Tanca, a young girl near Troyes in France who was martyred defending her virginity (c. 637)
 Saint Paulinus of York, Archbishop of York (644)
 Saint Aldericus (Aldric, Audri), Archbishop of Sens (841)
 Saint Paulinus of Capua, Bishop of Capua (843)
 Saint Fulk of Fontenelle, twenty-first Abbot of Fontenelle Abbey in France (845)

Post-Schism Orthodox saints

 Saint Amphilochius, Bishop of Vladimir, Volhynia (1122)  (see also: August 28 )
 Martyrdom of the 26 Martyrs of Zographou Monastery on Mount Athos by the Latins (1284):  (see also: September 22)
 Abbot Thomas, Monks Barsanuphius, Cyril, Micah, Simon, Hilarion, Job, James, Cyprian, Sabbas, James, Martinian, Cosmas, Sergius, Paul, Menas, Ioasaph, Ioannicius, Anthony, Euthymius, Dometian, and Parthenius, and four laymen.
 Saint Dionysios the Philosopher (1611)
 Blessed Andrew of Totma in Vologda, Fool-for-Christ (1673)
 Saint Innocent, Bishop of Penza (1819) 
 Venerable Ambrose of Optina, Elder of Optina Monastery (1891)

New Martys and Confessors

 New Hieromartyr Theodore (Pozdeyevsky), Archbishop of Volokolamsk (1937) (see also: March 21)

Other commemorations

 Synaxis of the Seven Saints of Volhynia:
 Saints Stephen (1094) and Amphilochius (1122), Bishops of Vladimir in Volhynia
 Saint Yaropolk-Peter, Prince of Vladimir in Volhynia (1086)
 St. Theodore (in monasticism Theodosius) of the Kiev Caves, Prince of Ostrog in Volhynia (1483)
 St. Juliana, Princess of Olshansk (c. 1540)
 St. Job of Pochaev, Abbot and Wonderworker of Pochaev (1651)
 Hieromartyr Macarius of Kanev, Archimandrite, of Obruch and Pinsk (1678)
 Zographou Icon of the Most Holy Theotokos "Of the Akathist.

Icon gallery

Notes

References

Sources 
 October 10/23. Orthodox Calendar (PRAVOSLAVIE.RU).
 October 23 / October 10. HOLY TRINITY RUSSIAN ORTHODOX CHURCH (A parish of the Patriarchate of Moscow).
 October 10. OCA - The Lives of the Saints.
 The Autonomous Orthodox Metropolia of Western Europe and the Americas (ROCOR). St. Hilarion Calendar of Saints for the year of our Lord 2004. St. Hilarion Press (Austin, TX). p. 75.
 The Tenth Day of the Month of October. Orthodoxy in China.
 October 10. Latin Saints of the Orthodox Patriarchate of Rome.
 The Roman Martyrology. Transl. by the Archbishop of Baltimore. Last Edition, According to the Copy Printed at Rome in 1914. Revised Edition, with the Imprimatur of His Eminence Cardinal Gibbons. Baltimore: John Murphy Company, 1916. pp. 313–314.
 Rev. Richard Stanton. A Menology of England and Wales, or, Brief Memorials of the Ancient British and English Saints Arranged According to the Calendar, Together with the Martyrs of the 16th and 17th Centuries. London: Burns & Oates, 1892. pp. 484–485.
Greek Sources
 Great Synaxaristes:  10 ΟΚΤΩΒΡΙΟΥ. ΜΕΓΑΣ ΣΥΝΑΞΑΡΙΣΤΗΣ.
  Συναξαριστής. 10 Οκτωβρίου. ECCLESIA.GR. (H ΕΚΚΛΗΣΙΑ ΤΗΣ ΕΛΛΑΔΟΣ).
  10/10/2017. Ορθόδοξος Συναξαριστής. 
Russian Sources
  23 октября (10 октября). Православная Энциклопедия под редакцией Патриарха Московского и всея Руси Кирилла (электронная версия). (Orthodox Encyclopedia - Pravenc.ru).
  10 октября по старому стилю / 23 октября по новому стилю. Русская Православная Церковь - Православный церковный календарь на 2016 год.

October in the Eastern Orthodox calendar